Gary Dulin (born January 20, 1957) is a former American football defensive end and defensive tackle. He played for the Ottawa Rough Riders from 1982 to 1984, the Saskatchewan Roughriders and Toronto Argonauts in 1985 and for the St. Louis Cardinals from 1986 to 1987.

References

1957 births
Living people
People from Madisonville, Kentucky
American football defensive ends
American football defensive tackles
Ohio State Buckeyes football players
Ottawa Rough Riders players
Saskatchewan Roughriders players
Toronto Argonauts players
St. Louis Cardinals (football) players
National Football League replacement players
Players of American football from Kentucky